Township is a unit of local government.  The term may also refer to:

Township (Canada)
 Townships of the People's Republic of China
 Township (Taiwan)
Township (England)
 Township (South Africa) refers to the urban living areas that, under Apartheid, were reserved for non-whites
Survey township, or Congressional township, used by the United States Public Land Survey System
Civil township, unit of local government in the United States
Township (United States)
 Alberta Township System, Canada
Township Roads in Saskatchewan
 Township, as defined by the Canadian Dominion Land Survey

Other uses 
 Township (unit), a unit in US surveyors' measures
 Township (video game), a 2013 freemium city-building game

See also
 Town (disambiguation)